A leadership election is a political contest held in various countries by which the members of a political party determine who will be the leader of their party.

Generally, any political party can determine its own rules governing how and when a leadership election is to be held for that party. In the United Kingdom, for example:

A leadership election may be required at intervals set by party rules, or it may be held in response to a certain proportion of those eligible to vote expressing a lack of confidence in the current leadership. In the UK Conservative Party, for example, "a leadership election can be triggered by a vote of no confidence by Conservative MPs in their current leader".

Strictly speaking, a leadership election is a completely internal affair. An intra-party election held to select its candidates for external offices, such as a president, governor, prime minister or member of a legislature is called a primary election.

Leadership elections have great importance in parliamentary systems, where the chief executive (e.g.: a Prime Minister) derives their mandate from a parliamentary majority and the party's internal leaders hold frontbench positions within the parliament, if not outright serving in a ministerial post – whether as Prime Minister in the case of the leading government party, or  another Ministerial post for junior coalition partners. For that reason, most parliamentary systems do not hold dedicated Prime Ministerial primaries at all, but simply select their internal leader as their candidate for Prime Minister.

However, leadership elections are often similar to primary elections in that in the vast majority of instances, a party's leader will become prime minister (in a federal election) or premier/chief minister/first minister (in a province, state, territory, or other first-level administrative subdivision) should their party enter government with the most seats. Thus, a leadership election is also often considered to be one for the party's de facto candidate for prime minister or premier/chief minister/first minister, just as a primary is one for a party's candidate for president.

An electoral alliance, which is composed of multiple parties each with its own separate leader and organs, may also hold a common Prime Ministerial primary as in the 2021 Hungarian opposition primary, or a single party may wish to retain its leader but select someone else as its Prime Ministerial candidate, as the Portuguese Socialist Party has done in 2014.

In presidential and semi-presidential systems, the chief executive (the President) can only be removed by an impeachment procedure, which can only be initiated in specific situations and by a special procedure (typically involving a legislative supermajority, an investigation by a constitutional court, or both), and removal entails either a snap election or automatic succession to office by a Vice president. As a result, leadership elections are largely background events, as the ruling party's policies are determined by the President, not by the party's internal leader. However, some systems allow one person to serve as both the President and the leader of the ruling party simultaneously, or even mandate it (such as the Democratic Progressive Party in Taiwan).

However, this is not entirely comparable to the parliamentary situation, as the majority and minority leaders of political parties in presidential systems are not the chief executive of their country (as a prime minister would be), but are rather officers of the legislative branch of their country, a position similar to the floor leader (which similarly is a post subservient to the prime minister) of a political party in a parliamentary system which likewise doesn't hold mass enfranchised elections for such a post.

North America

Canada
 
 2013 Liberal Party of Canada leadership election
 2020 Conservative Party of Canada leadership election
 2019 Bloc Québécois leadership election
 2017 New Democratic Party leadership election
 2020 Green Party of Canada leadership election
 2022 Conservative Party of Canada leadership election
 2022 Green Party of Canada leadership election

Trinidad and Tobago

2022 People's National Movement internal election
2022 United National Congress internal election

Europe

Croatia

Social Democratic Party of Croatia

 Elections in the Social Democratic Party of Croatia

Finland

 2017 Finns Party leadership election

Germany

 2021 Christian Democratic Union of Germany leadership election
 2019 Social Democratic Party of Germany leadership election

Greece

 2015–16 New Democracy leadership election
 2017 Greek centre-left leadership election

Ireland

Fine Gael

 2017 Fine Gael leadership election

Labour Party

 2016 Labour Party leadership election (Ireland)

Fianna Fáil

 1959 Fianna Fáil leadership election
 1966 Fianna Fáil leadership election
 1979 Fianna Fáil leadership election
 1992 Fianna Fáil leadership election
 1994 Fianna Fáil leadership election
 2008 Fianna Fáil leadership election
 2011 Fianna Fáil leadership election

Italy
 2013 Lega Nord leadership election
 2017 Five Star Movement leadership election
 2017 Italian Left leadership election
 2017 Lega Nord leadership election
 2019 More Europe leadership election
 2021 More Europe leadership election
 2021 Five Star Movement leadership election

Democratic Party

 2007 Democratic Party (Italy) leadership election
 2009 Democratic Party (Italy) leadership election
 2013 Democratic Party (Italy) leadership election
 2017 Democratic Party (Italy) leadership election
 2019 Democratic Party (Italy) leadership election

Netherlands

 People's Party for Freedom and Democracy leadership election, 2006
 2020 Christian Democratic Appeal leadership election
 2006 Democrats 66 leadership election
 2016 Labour Party (Netherlands) leadership election

Portugal

 2020 Portuguese Social Democratic Party leadership election

Spain

 Spanish Socialist Workers' Party: (2017)
 People's Party: (2018)
 Podemos: (2020)

United Kingdom

 2019 Conservative Party leadership election
 May 2021 Democratic Unionist Party leadership election
 June 2021 Democratic Unionist Party leadership election
 2020 Labour Party leadership election (UK)
 2020 Liberal Democrats leadership election
 2014 Scottish National Party leadership election
 2018 Green Party of England and Wales leadership election
 2019 UK Independence Party leadership election

Conservative Party

1965 Conservative Party leadership election
1975 Conservative Party leadership election
1989 Conservative Party leadership election
1990 Conservative Party leadership election
1995 Conservative Party leadership election
1997 Conservative Party leadership election
2001 Conservative Party leadership election
2003 Conservative Party leadership election
2005 Conservative Party leadership election
2016 Conservative Party leadership election
2019 Conservative Party leadership election
July–September 2022 Conservative Party leadership election
October 2022 Conservative Party leadership election

Labour Party

1922 Labour Party leadership election (UK)
1931 Labour Party leadership election
1932 Labour Party leadership election
1935 Labour Party leadership election
1955 Labour Party leadership election
1960 Labour Party leadership election
1961 Labour Party leadership election
1963 Labour Party leadership election (UK)
1976 Labour Party leadership election
1980 Labour Party leadership election (UK)
1983 Labour Party leadership election (UK)
1988 Labour Party leadership election (UK)
1992 Labour Party leadership election
1994 Labour Party leadership election
2007 Labour Party leadership election (UK)
2010 Labour Party leadership election (UK)
2015 Labour Party leadership election (UK)
2016 Labour Party leadership election (UK)
2020 Labour Party leadership election (UK)

Liberal Party/Social Democrats/Liberal Democrats

1967 Liberal Party leadership election
1976 Liberal Party leadership election
1982 Social Democratic Party leadership election
1988 Social and Liberal Democrats leadership election
1999 Liberal Democrats leadership election
2006 Liberal Democrats leadership election
2007 Liberal Democrats leadership election
2015 Liberal Democrats leadership election
2017 Liberal Democrats leadership election
2019 Liberal Democrats leadership election
2020 Liberal Democrats leadership election

Africa

South Africa

African National Congress

 54th National Conference of the African National Congress

Democratic Alliance

 2020 Democratic Alliance Federal Congress

Asia

Republic of China (Taiwan)

Democratic Progressive Party

 2006 Democratic Progressive Party chairmanship election
 2008 Democratic Progressive Party chairmanship election

Kuomintang

 2001 Kuomintang chairmanship election
 2005 Kuomintang chairmanship election
 2007 Kuomintang chairmanship election
 2009 Kuomintang chairmanship election
 2013 Kuomintang chairmanship election
 2015 Kuomintang chairmanship election
 2016 Kuomintang chairmanship election
 2017 Kuomintang chairmanship election
 2020 Kuomintang chairmanship election
 2021 Kuomintang chairmanship election

Israel

Israeli Labor Party
1992 Israeli Labor Party leadership election
2007 Israeli Labor Party leadership election
2011 Israeli Labor Party leadership election
2013 Israeli Labor Party leadership election
2017 Israeli Labor Party leadership election
2019 Israeli Labor Party leadership election
2021 Israeli Labor Party leadership election

Kadima
2008 Kadima leadership election
2012 Kadima leadership election

Likud
2012 Likud leadership election
2014 Likud leadership election
2019 Likud leadership election

Oceania

Australia

Australian Labor Party 

 2019 Australian Labor Party leadership election
 October 2013 Australian Labor Party leadership election

New Zealand

New Zealand Labour Party

 2017 New Zealand Labour Party leadership election
 2014 New Zealand Labour Party leadership election

See also
 Primary elections, a similar concept used to select a party's candidates for external office instead of its internal leadership
 Leadership convention (Canada)

References